Bolshoy Lug (Yekhe Nuga) is a rural locality (a selo) in Kyakhtinsky District, Republic of Buryatia, Russia. The population was 653 as of 2010. There are 11 streets.

Geography 
Bolshoy Lug is located 58 km northeast of Kyakhta (the district's administrative centre) by road. Kharlun is the nearest rural locality.

References 

Rural localities in Kyakhtinsky District